This is a list of regencies and city in Bangka Belitung Islands province. As of October 2019, there were 6 regencies and 1 city.

External links 

Regencies of Bangka Belitung Islands
Regencies, Indonesia
Regencies and cities